Emergence is an album by the American pop singer Neil Sedaka, released in 1971. The album was issued on the RCA Victor label, marking a short-lived reunion between Sedaka and RCA since RCA dropped him from their label at the end of 1966. Emergence was released in some areas on Kirshner Records, Don Kirshner's private record label. The album was not a sales success, but has acquired a cult following among Sedaka's fans. Four of its songs made their way onto 45 rpm singles releases: "I'm A Song (Sing Me)" b/w "Silent Movies" and "Superbird" b/w "Rosemary Blue". Of all the albums Sedaka has recorded, he considers Emergence to be his favorite.

Track listing
All tracks composed by Neil Sedaka and Howard Greenfield

Side one
"I'm a Song (Sing Me)"
"Gone with the Morning"
"Superbird"
"Silent Movies"
"Little Song"
"Prelude"
"Cardboard California"

Side two
"One More Mountain to Climb"
"God Bless Joanna"
"Is Anybody Gonna Miss You"
"What Have They Done to the Moon"
"Rosemary Blue"
"Wish I Was a Carousel"
"I'm a Song (Sing Me)" — reprise

Notes
 The opening track, "I'm A Song (Sing Me)", was also covered by Helen Reddy and Lou Christie; the Christie version was retitled "Sing Me, Sing Me".
 In 1976, Sedaka produced new versions of "I'm A Song (Sing Me)" and "Cardboard California" for his album Steppin' Out. "I'm A Song (Sing Me)" was retitled "Sing Me".

CD re-issue
This album was reissued on CD by BGO Records in 2009.

References

1971 albums
Neil Sedaka albums
Albums conducted by Lee Holdridge
Albums arranged by Lee Holdridge
RCA Records albums